A T-head engine is an early type of internal combustion engine that became obsolete after World War I.
It is a sidevalve engine that is distinguished from the much more common L-head by its placement of the valves.  The intake valves are on one side of the engine block and the exhaust valves on the other.  Seen from the end of the crankshaft, in cutaway view, the cylinder and combustion chamber resembles a T - hence the name "T-head".  An L-head has all valves at the same side.

Overview
This was an early form of crossflow cylinder head. The design was fairly complex for its day, requiring separate camshafts to operate the intake and exhaust valves. The T-heads themselves were typically complex castings requiring blind bores for the cylinders and valve chambers. This made the engine more expensive to produce than a comparable L-head (flathead) engine. Additionally, it was also quite heavy and inefficient for its displacement, producing less horsepower than a flathead or modern overhead valve engine of comparable displacement.  

The reason for this design's popularity from the turn of the 20th century into the 1920s was the type of gasoline sold at the time, which ignited at a much lower temperature than modern motor fuels. If the gasoline vapor got too hot or was compressed too much it could explode before being lit by the spark plug, a condition known as engine knocking or detonation. Since detonation was-and still is-a primary cause of catastrophic engine failure, limiting both the temperature and compression of the extremely explosive gasoline vapor was critical for maximum engine reliability.

The T-Head addressed both of these issues by putting the valves in open alcoves on opposite sides of the cylinder head and having cool water from the radiator enter the engine directly over the intake valves as an extra measure of safety. The heat transfer from the exhaust ports was thus minimized, and the extra volume of the open alcoves that housed the valves also lowered the effective compression ratio of the engine. Detonation was thus eliminated, and the relative inefficiency of the engine design was offset by the dramatic reliability gains achieved and the generally lower speeds of travel and racing common to the era.  In addition with the entire cylinder bore and all cooling passages frequently contained within the head many t-head engines required no head gasket and relatively few gaskets of any kind, reducing potential leakage. This superior reliability made the design a favorite racing engine in the earliest days of auto racing, when engine reliability arguably mattered more than maximum performance. As other engine designs improved in reliability thanks to the intense engine development done in World War I, the T-head's inherent compromises in performance caused it to rapidly fall out of favor for racing applications.

Obsolescence
The T-head was rendered obsolete in the passenger car market by a combination of engine advances made in World War I and the introduction of effective anti-knock compounds such as tetraethyl lead in the early 1920s. When combined, these advances made flathead engines just as reliable as T-heads while also being more powerful, lighter, more fuel efficient, and cheaper to manufacture. 
The T-heads' incredible reliability did however keep them in service in heavy equipment, large trucks, and fire trucks until they were finally phased out of production in the 1950s.

Examples
This engine type was found on cars like Mercedes and Stutz and the last T-head engine in production for personal cars was manufactured by an American company, Locomobile. Stutz and White Motor Car Company both used four valve engines in 1917, developing 65 and 72 horse power respectively. The White Company engine was a mono block design. The Pierce-Arrow company introduced a production four-valve per cylinder T-head motor (Dual Valve Six) in 1918, one of the few, perhaps the only, multi-valve valve-in-block type engines produced.  American LaFrance produced T-head engines for their fire engines until the 1950s, though they also built overhead-cam engines in the 1940s.

Cam-in-block valvetrain configurations
Cylinder head
Engine technology
Engine valvetrain configurations
Piston engines